Konrad Fuchs (October 15, 1897 Dingelsdorf near Konstanz  - November 13, 2006 in Hegne (Baden-Württemberg)) was, at the time of his death, the oldest living Catholic priest in Europe at 109 years and 29 days old, Germany's second-oldest man, and one of the last German First World War veterans.  He was the son of a churchwarden.   Fuchs met Georg Gänswein when Ganswein was an altar boy, the two kept in touch and continued to correspond in Fuchs' last years when Ganswein was secretary to Pope Benedict XVI.

References

1897 births
2006 deaths
People from Konstanz
People from the Grand Duchy of Baden
German centenarians
Men centenarians
German Army personnel of World War I
20th-century German Roman Catholic priests
Military personnel from Baden-Württemberg